Östra Göinge Municipality (Östra Göinge kommun) is a municipality in Scania County in southern Sweden. Its seat is located in Broby.

The present municipality was formed in 1974 when the former municipalities of Broby, Glimåkra, Hjärsås and Knislinge were amalgamated.

There are 8 smaller population centers (urban areas) in the municipality, where approximately 80 percent of the population lives, surrounded by sparsely populated rural areas.

Geography
It is a densely forested area with deciduous and coniferous trees, interspersed with open agricultural land. The river Helgeån runs through the municipality.

Localities
There are 8 urban areas (also called a Tätort or locality) in Östra Göinge Municipality. In the table they are listed according to the size of the population as of December 31, 2005. The municipal seat is in bold characters.

History
The Snapphane, Scanian resistance fighters of 17th century, took refuge in the forests of Östra Göinge. Considered rebels and bandits by the Swedish army, the Snapphanar were protected by the local population and their bravery is still cherished in the municipality. All of Göingebygden endured hardship and suffered devastation during the times after the Treaty of Roskilde in 1658, during Scania's transition from being a Danish to becoming a Swedish ruled territory.

The dialect of Göingebygden has historically been distinguishable from the southern Scanian dialects as well as the northern Småland dialects, perhaps because the population took pride in the area's historical autonomy and resilient resistance.

The coat of arms for Östra Göinge depicts two palm branches crossing each other, a traditional symbol of peace and unity designed for and given to the area after it became Swedish. The lower part of the coat of arms depicts hammers, and was added when the municipality was joined with an adjacent municipality in 1976.

Elections
Below are the results listed from since the 1973 municipal reform. Between 1988 and 1998 the Sweden Democrats' results were not published by the SCB due to the party's small size nationwide. "Turnout" denotes the percentage of the electorate casting a ballot, but "Votes" only applies to valid ballots cast.

Riksdag

Blocs

This lists the relative strength of the socialist and centre-right blocs since 1973, but parties not elected to the Riksdag are inserted as "other", including the Sweden Democrats results from 1988 to 2006, but also the Christian Democrats pre-1991 and the Greens in 1982, 1985 and 1991. The sources are identical to the table above. The coalition or government mandate marked in bold formed the government after the election. New Democracy got elected in 1991 but are still listed as "other" due to the short lifespan of the party. "Elected" is the total number of percentage points from the municipality that went to parties who were elected to the Riksdag.

Industry
A famous, very fine-grained black diabase is mined in Östra Göinge. Because of the extremely high quality of the diabase from this area, it is in high demand worldwide and has become popular with artists all over the globe, one of the more well-known being Takashi Naraha from Japan. It is primarily used for gravestones, monuments, sculptures, and other forms of stone artworks, but also to decorate buildings. The Empire State Building is partly covered with diabase from the area and the US Marine Corps War Memorial has a foundation of diabase from Göingebygden.

Scania AB and Tarkett have a presence in Östra Göinge.

References
Statistics Sweden

External links

Östra Göinge - Official site
Coat of arms

Municipalities of Skåne County